The Further and Higher Education Act 1992 made changes in the funding and administration of further education and higher education within England and Wales, with consequential effects on associated matters in Scotland which had previously been governed by the same legislation as England and Wales. It was introduced during the First Major ministry.

The most visible result was to allow thirty-five polytechnics to become universities (often referred to as the "new universities" or "post-1992 universities"). A goal of the act was to end the distinction – known as the "binary divide" – between colleges and universities. 

In addition, the act created bodies to fund higher education in England—HEFCE—and further education—FEFC. Universities in Scotland and Wales which had previously been funded by the UK-wide Universities Funding Council were the subject of other acts that created higher education funding councils in each country. The act also removed colleges of further education from local government control, and created quality assessment arrangements.

See also

References

External links 
 Further and Higher Education Act, 1992 (for England and Wales)
 Further and Higher Education (Scotland) Act 1992 (for Scotland)

United Kingdom Acts of Parliament 1992
United Kingdom Education Acts
Educational administration
1992 in education
University-related legislation
Higher education law